Levani Gvazava (born 8 July 1980) is a Georgian and Russian football manager and a former player.

Career

Club
On 1 September 2014, Gvazava signed a one-year contract with Anzhi Makhachkala.

International
In 2010, he was called up for the national team of his country for the first time.

References

External links 
 
 http://fc-terek.ru/component/option,com_joomleague/func,showPlayer/p,6/pid,66/Itemid,88888920/

1980 births
Living people
People from Samegrelo-Zemo Svaneti
Mingrelians
Footballers from Georgia (country)
Expatriate footballers from Georgia (country)
Russian footballers
Association football midfielders
FC Zimbru Chișinău players
FC Spartak Vladikavkaz players
FC Luch Vladivostok players
PFC Spartak Nalchik players
FC Akhmat Grozny players
FC Khimki players
Russian Premier League players
Expatriate footballers in Moldova
Expatriate sportspeople from Georgia (country) in Moldova
FC Dinamo Batumi players
FC Anzhi Makhachkala players
Russian football managers